Kärsta och Bredsdal is a bimunicipal locality situated in Västerås Municipality, Västmanland County and Enköping Municipality, Uppsala County in Sweden with 261 inhabitants in 2010.

References 

Populated places in Uppsala County
Populated places in Västmanland County
Populated places in Enköping Municipality
Populated places in Västerås Municipality